Līga is a Latvian given name. Its nameday is on June 23, which is the Latvian festival day of Līgo.

Persons
Līga Dekmeijere (born 1983), Latvian tennis player
Līga Glāzere (born 1986), Latvian biathlete 
Līga Kļaviņa (born 1980), Latvian female heptathlete
Līga Liepiņa (born 1946), Latvian actress
Līga Purmale (born 1948), Latvian painter
Līga Velvere (born 1990), Latvian athlete track and field athlete

See also
 Liga (disambiguation)

Latvian feminine given names